Dr. Francis Kwame Nkrumah  (21 September 190927 April 1972) was a Ghanaian politician, political theorist, and revolutionary. He was the first Prime Minister and President of Ghana, having led the Gold Coast to independence from Britain in 1957. An influential advocate of Pan-Africanism, Nkrumah was a founding member of the Organization of African Unity and winner of the Lenin Peace Prize from the Soviet Union in 1962.

After twelve years abroad pursuing higher education, developing his political philosophy, and organizing with other diasporic pan-Africanists, Nkrumah returned to the Gold Coast to begin his political career as an advocate of national independence. He formed the Convention People's Party, which achieved rapid success through its unprecedented appeal to the common voter. He became Prime Minister in 1952 and retained the position when Ghana declared independence from Britain in 1957. In 1960, Ghanaians approved a new constitution and elected Nkrumah President.

His administration was primarily socialist as well as nationalist. It funded national industrial and energy projects, developed a strong national education system and promoted a pan-Africanist culture. Under Nkrumah, Ghana played a leading role in African international relations during the decolonization period.

Nkrumah led an authoritarian regime in Ghana, as he repressed political opposition and conducted elections that were not free and fair. In 1964, a constitutional amendment made Ghana a one-party state, with Nkrumah as president for life of both the nation and its party. Nkrumah was deposed in 1966 by the National Liberation Council, under whose supervision international financial institutions privatized many of the country's state corporations. Nkrumah lived the rest of his life in Guinea, where he was named honorary co-president.

Early life and education

Gold Coast 
Kwame Nkrumah was born on 21 September 1909
\ in Nkroful, Gold Coast (now Ghana). Nkroful was a small village in the Nzema area, in the southwest of the Gold Coast, close to the frontier with the French colony of the Ivory Coast. His father did not live with the family, but worked in Half Assini where he pursued his goldsmith business until his death. Kwame Nkrumah was raised by his mother and his extended family, who lived together traditionally, with more distant relatives often visiting. He lived a carefree childhood, spent in the village, in the bush, and on the nearby sea. By the naming customs of the Akan people, he was given the name Kwame, the name given to males born on Saturday. During his years as a student in the United States, though, he was known as Francis Nwia Kofi Nkrumah, Kofi being the name given to males born on Fridays. He later changed his name to Kwame Nkrumah in 1945 in the UK, preferring the name "Kwame". According to Ebenezer Obiri Addo in his study of the future president, the name "Nkrumah", a name traditionally given to a ninth child, indicates that Kwame probably held that place in the house of his father, who had several wives.

His father, Opanyin Kofi Nwiana Ngolomah, came from Nkroful, belonging to Akan tribe of the Asona clan. Sources indicated that Ngolomah stayed at Tarkwa-Nsuaem and dealt in the goldsmith business. In addition, Ngolomah was respected for his wise counsel by those who sought his advice on traditional issues and domestic affairs. He died in 1927.

Kwame was the only child of his mother. Nkrumah's mother sent him to the elementary school run by a Catholic mission at Half Assini, where he proved an adept student. A German Roman Catholic priest by the name of George Fischer was said to have profoundly influenced his elementary school education. Although his mother, whose name was Elizabeth Nyanibah (1876/77–1979), later stated his year of birth was 1912, Nkrumah wrote that he was born on 21 September 1909. Nyanibah, who hailed from Nsuaem and belongs to the Agona family, was a fishmonger and petty trader when she married his father. Eight days after his birth, his father named him as Francis Nwia-Kofi after a relative but later his parents named him as Francis Kwame Ngolomah. He progressed through the ten-year elementary programme in eight years. By about 1925 he was a student-teacher in the school, and had been baptized into the Catholic faith. While at the school, he was noticed by the Reverend Alec Garden Fraser, principal of the Government Training College (soon to become Achimota School) in the Gold Coast's capital, Accra. Fraser arranged for Nkrumah to train as a teacher at his school. Here, Columbia-educated deputy headmaster Kwegyir Aggrey exposed him to the ideas of Marcus Garvey and W. E. B. Du Bois. Aggrey, Fraser, and others at Achimota thought that there should be close co-operation between the races in governing the Gold Coast, but Nkrumah, echoing Garvey, soon came to believe that only when the black race governed itself could there be harmony between the races.

After obtaining his teacher's certificate from the Prince of Wales' College at Achimota in 1930, Nkrumah was given a teaching post at the Roman Catholic primary school in Elmina in 1931, and after a year there, was made headmaster of the school at Axim. In Axim, he started to get involved in politics and founded the Nzima Literary Society. In 1933, he was appointed a teacher at the Catholic seminary at Amissano. Although the life there was strict, he liked it, and considered becoming a Jesuit. Nkrumah had heard journalist and future Nigerian president Nnamdi Azikiwe speak while a student at Achimota; the two men met and Azikiwe's influence increased Nkrumah's interest in black nationalism. The young teacher decided to further his education. Azikiwe had attended Lincoln University, a historically black college in Chester County, Pennsylvania, west of Philadelphia, and he advised Nkrumah to enroll there. Nkrumah, who had failed the entrance examination for London University, gained funds for the trip and his education from relatives. He travelled by way of Britain, where he learned, to his outrage, of Italy's invasion of Ethiopia, one of the few independent African nations. He arrived in the United States, in October 1935.

United States 

According to historian John Henrik Clarke in his article on Nkrumah's American sojourn, "the influence of the ten years that he spent in the United States would have a lingering effect on the rest of his life."  Nkrumah had sought entry to Lincoln University some time before he began his studies there. On 1 March 1935, he sent the school a letter noting that his application had been pending for more than a year. When he arrived in New York in October 1935, he traveled to Pennsylvania, where he enrolled despite lacking the funds for the full semester. He soon won a scholarship that provided for his tuition at Lincoln University. He remained short of funds through his time in the US. To make ends meet, he worked in menial jobs, including as a dishwasher. On Sundays, he visited black Presbyterian churches in Philadelphia and in New York.

Nkrumah completed a Bachelor of Arts degree in economics and sociology in 1939. Lincoln then appointed him an assistant lecturer in philosophy, and he began to receive invitations to be a guest preacher in Presbyterian churches in Philadelphia and New York. In 1939, Nkrumah enrolled at Lincoln's seminary and at the Ivy League University of Pennsylvania in Philadelphia and in 1942, he was initiated into the Mu chapter of Phi Beta Sigma fraternity at Lincoln University. Nkrumah gained a Bachelor of Theology degree from Lincoln in 1942, the top student in the course. He earned from Penn the following year a Master of Arts degree in philosophy and a Master of Science in education. While at Penn, Nkrumah worked with the linguist William Everett Welmers, providing the spoken material that formed the basis of the first descriptive grammar of his native Fante dialect of the Akan language.

Nkrumah spent his summers in Harlem, a center of black life, thought and culture. He found housing and employment in New York City with difficulty and involved himself in the community. He spent many evenings listening to and arguing with street orators, and according to Clarke, Kwame Nkrumah in his years in America stated;

Nkrumah was an activist student, organizing a group of expatriate African students in Pennsylvania and building it into the African Students Association of America and Canada, becoming its president. Some members felt that the group should aspire for each colony to gain independence on its own; Nkrumah urged a Pan-African strategy. Nkrumah played a major role in the Pan-African conference held in New York in 1944, which urged the United States, at the end of the Second World War, to help ensure Africa became developed and free.

His old teacher Aggrey had died in 1929 in the US, and in 1942 Nkrumah led traditional prayers for Aggrey at the graveside. This led to a break between him and Lincoln, though after he rose to prominence in the Gold Coast, he returned in 1951 to accept an honorary degree. Nevertheless, Nkrumah's doctoral thesis remained uncompleted. He had adopted the forename Francis while at the Amissano seminary; in 1945 he took the name Kwame Nkrumah.

Nkrumah read books about politics and divinity, and tutored students in philosophy. In 1943 Nkrumah met Trinidadian Marxist C. L. R. James, Russian expatriate Raya Dunayevskaya, and Chinese-American Grace Lee Boggs, all of whom were members of an American-based Marxist intellectual cohort. Nkrumah later credited James with teaching him "how an underground movement worked". Federal Bureau of Investigation files on Nkrumah, kept from January to May 1945, identify him as a possible communist. Nkrumah was determined to go to London, wanting to continue his education there now that the Second World War had ended. James, in a 1945 letter introducing Nkrumah to Trinidad-born George Padmore in London, wrote: "This young man is coming to you. He is not very bright, but nevertheless do what you can for him because he's determined to throw Europeans out of Africa."

London 

Nkrumah returned to London in May 1945 and enrolled at the London School of Economics as a PhD candidate in anthropology. He withdrew after one term and the next year enrolled at University College, with the intent to write a philosophy dissertation on "Knowledge and Logical Positivism". His supervisor, A. J. Ayer, declined to rate Nkrumah as a "first-class philosopher", saying, "I liked him and enjoyed talking to him but he did not seem to me to have an analytical mind. He wanted answers too quickly. I think part of the trouble may have been that he wasn't concentrating very hard on his thesis. It was a way of marking time until the opportunity came for him to return to Ghana." Finally, Nkrumah enrolled in, but did not complete, a study in law at Gray's Inn.

Nkrumah spent his time on political organizing. He and Padmore were among the principal organizers, and co-treasurers, of the Fifth Pan-African Congress in Manchester (15–19 October 1945). The Congress elaborated a strategy for supplanting colonialism with African socialism. They agreed to pursue a federal United States of Africa, with interlocking regional organizations, governing through separate states of limited sovereignty. They planned to pursue a new African culture without tribalism, democratic within a socialist system, synthesizing traditional aspects with modern thinking, and for this to be achieved by nonviolent means if possible. Among those who attended the congress was the venerable W. E. B. Du Bois along with some who later took leading roles in leading their nations to independence, including Hastings Banda of Nyasaland (which became Malawi), Jomo Kenyatta of Kenya and Obafemi Awolowo of Nigeria.

The congress sought to establish ongoing African activism in Britain in conjunction with the West African National Secretariat (WANS) to work towards the decolonisation of Africa. Nkrumah became the secretary of WANS. In addition to seeking to organize Africans to gain their nations' freedom, Nkrumah sought to succour the many West African seamen who had been stranded, destitute, in London at the end of the war, and established a Coloured Workers Association to empower and succour them. The U.S. State Department and MI5 watched Nkrumah and the WANS, focusing on their links with Communism. Nkrumah and Padmore established a group called The Circle to lead the way to West African independence and unity; the group aimed to create a Union of African Socialist Republics. A document from The Circle, setting forth that goal was found on Nkrumah upon his arrest in Accra in 1948, and was used against him by the British authorities.

Return to the Gold Coast

United Gold Coast Convention 
The 1946 Gold Coast constitution gave Africans a majority on the Legislative Council for the first time. Seen as a major step towards self-government, the new arrangement prompted the colony's first true political party, founded in August 1947, the United Gold Coast Convention (UGCC). The UGCC sought self-government as quickly as possible. Since the leading members were all successful professionals, they needed to pay someone to run the party, and their choice fell on Nkrumah at the suggestion of Ako Adjei. Nkrumah hesitated, realizing the UGCC was controlled by conservative interests, but decided that the new post gave him huge political opportunities, and accepted. After being questioned by British officials about his communist affiliations, Nkrumah boarded the MV Accra at Liverpool in November 1947 for the voyage home.

After brief stops in Sierra Leone, Liberia, and the Ivory Coast, he arrived in the Gold Coast, and after a brief stay and reunion with his mother in Tarkwa, began work at the party's headquarters in Saltpond on 29 December 1947 where he worked as a general secretary. Nkrumah quickly submitted plans for branches of the UGCC to be established colony-wide, and for strikes if necessary to gain political ends. This activist stance divided the party's governing committee, which was led by J. B. Danquah. Nkrumah embarked on a tour to gain donations for the UGCC and establish new branches.

Although the Gold Coast was politically more advanced than Britain's other West Africa colonies, there was considerable discontent. Postwar inflation had caused public anger at high prices, leading to a boycott of the small stores run by Arabs which began in January 1948. The cocoa bean farmers were upset because trees exhibiting swollen-shoot disease, but still capable of yielding a crop, were being destroyed by the colonial authorities. There were about 63,000 ex-servicemen in the Gold Coast, many of whom had trouble obtaining employment and felt the colonial government was doing nothing to address their grievances. Nkrumah and Danquah addressed a meeting of the Ex-Service men's Union in Accra on 20 February 1948, which was in preparation for a march to present a petition to the governor. When that demonstration took place on 28 February, there was gunfire from the British, prompting the 1948 Accra riots, which spread throughout the country. According to Nkrumah's biographer, David Birmingham, "West Africa's erstwhile "model colony" witnessed a riot and business premises were looted. The African Revolution had begun."

The government assumed that the UGCC was responsible for the unrest, and arrested six leaders, including Nkrumah and Danquah. The Big Six were incarcerated together in Kumasi, increasing the rift between Nkrumah and the others, who blamed him for the riots and their detention. After the British learned that there were plots to storm the prison, the six were separated, with Nkrumah sent to Lawra. They were freed in April 1948. Many students and teachers had demonstrated for their release, and been suspended; Nkrumah, using his own funds, began the Ghana National College. This, among other activities, led UGCC committee members to accuse him of acting in the party's name without authority. Fearing he would harm them more outside the party than within, they agreed to make him honorary treasurer. Nkrumah's popularity, already large, was increased with his founding of the Accra Evening News, which was not a party organ but was owned by Nkrumah and others. He also founded the Committee on Youth Organization (CYO) as a youth wing for the UGCC. It soon broke away and adopted the motto "Self-Government Now". The CYO united students, ex-servicemen, and market women. Nkrumah recounted in his autobiography that he knew that a break with the UGCC was inevitable, and wanted the masses behind him when the conflict occurred. Nkrumah's appeals for "Free-Dom" appealed to the great numbers of underemployed youths who had come from the farms and villages to the towns. "Old hymn tunes were adapted to new songs of liberation which welcomed traveling orators, and especially Nkrumah himself, to mass rallies across the Gold Coast."

According to a public speech delivered by Prof. Oquaye, he claimed a meeting occurred in Saltpond, a town in the Central region, between Nkrumah and the members of UGCC where Nkrumah was said to have rejected a proposal for the promotion of fundamental human rights.

Convention People's Party 

Beginning in April 1949, there was considerable pressure on Nkrumah from his supporters to leave the UGCC and form his own party. On 12 June 1949, he announced the formation of the Convention People's Party (CPP), with the word "convention" chosen, according to Nkrumah, "to carry the masses with us". There were attempts to heal the breach with the UGCC; at one July meeting, it was agreed to reinstate Nkrumah as secretary and disband the CPP. But Nkrumah's supporters would not have it, and persuaded him to refuse the offer and remain at their head.

The CPP adopted the red cockerel as its symbol – a familiar icon for local ethnic groups, and a symbol of leadership, alertness, and masculinity. Party symbols and colours (red, white, and green) appeared on clothing, flags, vehicles and houses. CPP operatives drove red-white-and-green vans across the country, playing music and rallying public support for the party and especially for Nkrumah. These efforts were wildly successful, especially because previous political efforts in the Gold Coast had focused exclusively on the urban intelligentsia.

The British convened a selected commission of middle-class Africans, including all of the Big Six except Nkrumah, to draft a new constitution that would give Ghana more self-government. Nkrumah saw, even before the commission reported, that its recommendations would fall short of full dominion status, and began to organize a Positive Action campaign. Nkrumah demanded a constituent assembly to write a constitution. When the governor, Charles Arden-Clarke, would not commit to this, Nkrumah called for Positive Action, with the unions beginning a general strike to begin on 8 January 1950. The strike quickly led to violence, and Nkrumah and other CPP leaders were arrested on 22 January, and the Evening News was banned. Nkrumah was sentenced to a total of three years in prison, and he was incarcerated with common criminals in Accra's Fort James.

Nkrumah's assistant, Komla Agbeli Gbedemah, ran the CPP in his absence; the imprisoned leader was able to influence events through smuggled notes written on toilet paper. The British prepared for an election for the Gold Coast under their new constitution, and Nkrumah insisted that the CPP contest all seats. The situation had become calmer once Nkrumah was arrested, and the CPP and the British worked together to prepare electoral rolls. Nkrumah stood, from prison, for a directly elected Accra seat. Gbedemah worked to set up a nationwide campaign organization, using vans with loudspeakers to blare the party's message. The UGCC failed to set up a nationwide structure, and proved unable to take advantage of the fact that many of its opponents were in prison.

In the February 1951 legislative election, the first general election to be held under universal franchise in colonial Africa, the CPP was elected in a landslide. The CPP secured 34 of the 38 seats contested on a party basis, with Nkrumah elected for his Accra constituency. The UGCC won three seats, and one was taken by an independent. Arden-Clarke saw that the only alternative to Nkrumah's freedom was the end of the constitutional experiment. Nkrumah was released from prison on 12 February, receiving a rapturous reception from his followers. The following day, Arden-Clarke sent for him and asked him to form a government.

Nkrumah had stolen Arden-Clarke's secretary Erica Powell after she was dismissed and sent home for getting too close to Nkrumah. Powell returned to Ghana in January 1955 to be Nkrumah's private secretary, a position she held for ten years. Powell was very close to him and during their time together time Powell largely wrote Nkrumah's (auto)biography, although this was not admitted until much later.

Leader of Government Business and Prime Minister 
Nkrumah faced several challenges as he assumed office. He had never served in government, and needed to learn that art.  The Gold Coast was composed of four regions, several former colonies amalgamated into one. Nkrumah sought to unite them under one nationality, and bring the country to independence. Key to meeting the challenges was convincing the British that the CPP's programmes were not only practical, but inevitable, and Nkrumah and Arden-Clarke worked closely together. The governor instructed the civil service to give the fledgling government full support, and the three British members of the cabinet took care not to vote against the elected majority.

Prior to the CPP taking office, British officials had prepared a ten-year plan for development. With demands for infrastructure improvements coming in from all over the colony, Nkrumah approved it in general, but halved the time to five years. The colony was in good financial shape, with reserves from years of cocoa profit held in London, and Nkrumah was able to spend freely. Modern trunk roads were built along the coast and within the interior. The rail system was modernized and expanded. Modern water and sewer systems were installed in most towns, where housing schemes were begun. Construction began on a new harbor at Tema, near Accra, and the existing port, at Takoradi, was expanded. An urgent programme to build and expand schools, from primary to teacher and trade training, was begun. From 1951 to 1956, the number of pupils being educated at the colony's schools rose from 200,000 to 500,000. Nevertheless, the number of graduates being produced was insufficient to the burgeoning civil service's needs, and in 1953, Nkrumah announced that though Africans would be given preference, the country would be relying on expatriate European civil servants for several years.

Nkrumah's title was Leader of Government Business in a cabinet chaired by Arden-Clarke. Quick progress was made, and in 1952, the governor withdrew from the cabinet, leaving Nkrumah as his prime minister, with the portfolios that had been reserved for expatriates going to Africans. There were accusations of corruption, and of nepotism, as officials, following African custom, attempted to benefit their extended families and their tribes. The recommendations following the 1948 riots had included elected local government rather than the existing system dominated by the chiefs. This was uncontroversial until it became clear that it would be implemented by the CPP. That party's majority in the Legislative Assembly passed legislation in late 1951 that shifted power from the chiefs to the chairs of the councils, though there was some local rioting as rates were imposed.

Nkrumah's re-titling as prime minister had not given him additional power, and he sought constitutional reform that would lead to independence. In 1952, he consulted with the visiting Colonial Secretary, Oliver Lyttelton, who indicated that Britain would look favorably on further advancement, so long as the chiefs and other stakeholders had the opportunity to express their views. Initially skeptical of Nkrumah's socialist policies, Britain's MI5 had compiled large amounts of intelligence on Nkrumah through several sources, including tapping phones and mail interception under the code name of SWIFT. Beginning in October 1952, Nkrumah sought opinions from councils and from political parties on reform, and consulted widely across the country, including with opposition groups. The result the following year was a White Paper on a new constitution, seen as a final step before independence. Published in June 1953, the constitutional proposals were accepted both by the assembly and by the British, and came into force in April of the following year. The new document provided for an assembly of 104 members, all directly elected, with an all-African cabinet responsible for the internal governing of the colony. In the election on 15 June 1954, the CPP won 71, with the regional Northern People's Party forming the official opposition.

A number of opposition groups formed the National Liberation Movement. Their demands were for a federal, rather than a unitary government for an independent Gold Coast, and for an upper house of parliament where chiefs and other traditional leaders could act as a counter to the CPP majority in the assembly. They drew considerable support in the Northern Territory and among the chiefs in Ashanti, who petitioned the British queen, Elizabeth II, asking for a Royal Commission into what form of government the Gold Coast should have. This was refused by her government, who in 1955 stated that such a commission should only be used if the people of the Gold Coast proved incapable of deciding their own affairs. Amid political violence, the two sides attempted to reconcile their differences, but the NLM refused to participate in any committee with a CPP majority. The traditional leaders were also incensed by a new bill that had just been enacted, which allowed minor chiefs to appeal to the government in Accra, bypassing traditional chiefly authority. The British were unwilling to leave unresolved the fundamental question as to how an independent Gold Coast should be governed, and in June 1956, the Colonial Secretary, Alan Lennox-Boyd announced that there would be another general election in the Gold Coast, and if a "reasonable majority" took the CPP's position, Britain would set a date for independence. The results of the July 1956 election were almost identical to those from four years before, and on 3 August the assembly voted for independence under the name Nkrumah had proposed in April, Ghana. In September, the Colonial Office announced independence day would be 6 March 1957.

The opposition was not satisfied with the plan for independence, and demanded that power be devolved to the regions. Discussions took place through late 1956 and into 1957. Although Nkrumah did not compromise on his insistence on a unitary state, the nation was divided into five regions, with power devolved from Accra, and the chiefs having a role in their governments. On 21 February 1957, the British prime minister, Harold Macmillan, announced that Ghana would be a full member of the Commonwealth of Nations with effect from 6 March.

Ghanaian independence

Ghana became independent on 6 March 1957. As the first of Britain's African colonies to gain majority-rule independence, the celebrations in Accra were the focus of world attention; over 100 reporters and photographers covered the events. United States President Dwight D. Eisenhower sent congratulations and his vice president, Richard Nixon, to represent the U.S. at the event. The Soviet delegation urged Nkrumah to visit Moscow as soon as possible. Political scientist Ralph Bunche, an African American, was there for the United Nations, while the Duchess of Kent represented Queen Elizabeth. Offers of assistance poured in from across the world. Even without them, the country seemed prosperous, with cocoa prices high and the potential of new resource development.

As the fifth of March turned to the sixth, Nkrumah stood before tens of thousands of supporters and proclaimed, "Ghana will be free forever." He spoke at the first session of the Ghana Parliament that Independence Day, telling his new country's citizens that "we have a duty to prove to the world that Africans can conduct their own affairs with efficiency and tolerance and through the exercise of democracy. We must set an example to all Africa."

Nkrumah was hailed as the Osagyefo – which means "redeemer" in the Akan language. This independence ceremony included the Duchess of Kent and Governor General Charles Arden-Clarke. With more than 600 reporters in attendance, Ghanaian independence became one of the most internationally reported news events in modern African history.

The flag of Ghana designed by Theodosia Okoh, inverting Ethiopia's green-yellow-red Lion of Judah flag and replacing the lion with a black star. Red symbolizes bloodshed; green stands for beauty, agriculture, and abundance; yellow represents mineral wealth; and the Black Star represents African freedom. The country's new coat of arms, designed by Amon Kotei, includes eagles, a lion, a St. George's Cross, and a Black Star, with copious gold and gold trim. Philip Gbeho was commissioned to compose the new national anthem, "God Bless Our Homeland Ghana".

As a monument to the new nation, Nkrumah opened Black Star Square near Osu Castle in the coastal district of Osu, Accra. This square would be used for national symbolism and mass patriotic rallies.

Under Nkrumah's leadership, Ghana adopted some social democratic policies and practices. Nkrumah created a welfare system, started various community programs, and established schools.

Ghana's leader (1957–1966)

Political developments and presidential election 

Nkrumah had only a short honeymoon before there was unrest among his people. The government deployed troops to Togo-land to quell unrest following a disputed plebiscite on membership in the new country. A serious bus strike in Accra stemmed from resentments among the Ga people, who believed members of other tribes were getting preferential treatment in government promotion, and this led to riots there in August. Nkrumah's response was to repress local movements by the Avoidance of Discrimination Act (6 December 1957), which banned regional or tribal-based political parties. Another strike at tribalism fell in Ashanti, where Nkrumah and the CPP got most local chiefs who were not party supporters destooled. These repressive actions concerned the opposition parties, who came together to form the United Party under Kofi Abrefa Busia.

In 1958, an opposition MP was arrested on charges of trying to obtain arms abroad for a planned infiltration of the Ghana Army (GA). Nkrumah was convinced there had been an assassination plot against him, and his response was to have the parliament pass the Preventive Detention Act, allowing for incarceration for up to five years without charge or trial, with only Nkrumah empowered to release prisoners early. According to Nkrumah's biographer, David Birmingham, "no single measure did more to bring down Nkrumah's reputation than his adoption of internment without trial for the preservation of security." Nkrumah intended to bypass the British-trained judiciary, which he saw as opposing his plans when they subjected them to constitutional scrutiny.

Another source of irritation was the regional assemblies, which had been organized on an interim basis pending further constitutional discussions. The opposition, which was strong in Ashanti and the north, proposed significant powers for the assemblies; the CPP wanted them to be more or less advisory. In 1959, Nkrumah used his majority in the parliament to push through the Constitutional Amendment Act, which abolished the assemblies and allowed the parliament to amend the constitution with a simple majority.

Queen Elizabeth II remained sovereign over Ghana from 1957 to 1960. William Hare, 5th Earl of Listowel was the Governor-General, and Nkrumah remained Prime Minister. On 6 March 1960, Nkrumah announced plans for a new constitution which would make Ghana a republic, headed by a president with broad executive and legislative powers. The draft included a provision to surrender Ghanaian sovereignty to a Union of African States. On 19, 23, and 27 April 1960 a presidential election and plebiscite on the constitution were held. The constitution was ratified and Nkrumah was elected president over J. B. Danquah, the UP candidate, 1,016,076 to 124,623. Ghana remained a part of the British-led Commonwealth of Nations.

Opposition to tribalism 

Nkrumah also sought to eliminate "tribalism", a source of loyalties held more deeply than those to the nation-state. Thus, as he wrote in Africa Must Unite: "We were engaged in a kind of war, a war against poverty and disease, against ignorance, against tribalism and disunity. We needed to secure the conditions which could allow us to pursue our policy of reconstruction and development." To this end, in 1958, his government passed "An Act to prohibit organizations using or engaging in racial or religious propaganda to the detriment of any other racial or religious community, or securing the election of persons on account of their racial or religious affiliations, or for other purposes in connection therewith." Nkrumah attempted to saturate the country in national flags, and declared a widely disobeyed ban on tribal flags.

Kofi Abrefa Busia of the United Party (Ghana) gained prominence as an opposition leader in the debate over this Act, taking a more classically liberal position and criticizing the ban on tribal politics as repressive. Soon after, he left the country. Nkrumah was also a very flamboyant leader. The New York Times in 1972 wrote: "During his high‐flying days as the leader of Ghana in the 1950s and early 1960s, Kwame Nkrumah was a flamboyant spellbinder. At home, he created a cult of personality and gloried in the title of 'Osagyefo' (Redeemer). Abroad, he rubbed elbows with the world's leaders as the first man to lead an African colony to independence after World War II."

During his tenure as Prime Minister and then President, Nkrumah succeeded in reducing the political importance of the local chieftaincy (e.g., the Akan chiefs and the Asantehene). These chiefs had maintained authority during colonial rule through collaboration with the British authorities; in fact, they were sometimes favored over the local intelligentsia, who made trouble for the British with organizations like the Aborigines' Rights Protection Society. The Convention People's Party had a strained relationship with the chiefs when it came to power, and this relationship became more hostile as the CPP incited political opposition chiefs and criticized the institution as undemocratic. Acts passed in 1958 and 1959 gave the government more power to dis-stool chiefs directly, and proclaimed government of stool land – and revenues. These policies alienated the chiefs and led them to looking favorably on the overthrow of Nkrumah and his Party.

Increased power of the Convention People's Party 

In 1962, three younger members of the CPP were brought up on charges of taking part in a plot to blow up Nkrumah's car in a motorcade. The sole evidence against the alleged plotters was that they rode in cars well behind Nkrumah's car. When the defendants were acquitted, Nkrumah sacked the chief judge of the state security court, then got the CPP-dominated parliament to pass a law allowing a new trial. At this second trial, all three men were convicted and sentenced to death, though these sentences were subsequently commuted to life imprisonment. Shortly afterward, the constitution was amended to give the president the power to summarily remove judges at all levels.

In 1964, Nkrumah proposed a constitutional amendment which would make the CPP the only legal party, with Nkrumah as president for life of both nation and party. The amendment passed with 99.91 percent of the vote, an implausibly high total that led observers to condemn the vote as "obviously rigged". Ghana had effectively been a one-party state since independence. The amendment transformed Nkrumah's presidency into a de facto legal dictatorship.

Civil service 

After substantial Africanization of the civil service in 1952–60, the number of expatriates rose again from 1960 to 1965. Many of the new outside workers came not from the United Kingdom but from the Soviet Union, Poland, Czechoslovakia, Yugoslavia, and Italy.

Education

In 1951, the CPP created the Accelerated Development Plan for Education. This plan set up a six-year primary course, to be attended as close to universally as possible, with a range of possibilities to follow. All children were to learn arithmetic, as well as gain "a sound foundation for citizenship with permanent literacy in both English and the vernacular." Primary education became compulsory in 1962. The plan also stated that religious schools would no longer receive funding, and that some existing missionary schools would be taken over by government.

In 1961, Nkrumah laid the first stones in the foundation of the Kwame Nkrumah Ideological Institute created to train Ghanaian civil servants as well as promote Pan-Africanism. In 1964, all students entering college in Ghana were required to attend a two-week "ideological orientation" at the institute. Nkrumah remarked that "trainees should be made to realize the party's ideology is religion, and should be practiced faithfully and fervently."

In 1964, Nkrumah brought forth the Seven Year Development Plan for National Reconstruction and Development, which identified education as a key source of development and called for the expansion of secondary technical schools. Secondary education would also include "in-service training programmes". As Nkrumah told Parliament: "Employers, both public and private, will be expected to make a far greater contribution to labour training through individual factory and farm schools, industry-wide training schemes, day release, payment for attendance at short courses and evening classes." This training would be indirectly subsidized with tax credits and import allocations.

In 1952, the Artisan Trading Scheme, arranged with the Colonial Office and UK Ministry of Labour, provided for a few experts in every field to travel to Britain for technical education. Kumasi Technical Institute was founded in 1956. In September 1960, it added the Technical Teacher Training Centre. In 1961, the CPP passed the Apprentice Act, which created a general Apprenticeship Board along with committees for each industry.

Culture 

Nkrumah was an ardent promoter of pan-Africanism, seeing the movement as the "quest for regional integration of the whole of the African continent". The period of Nkrumah's active political involvement has been described as the "golden age of high pan-African ambitions"; the continent had experienced rising nationalist movements and decolonization by most European colonial powers, and historians have noted that "the narrative of rebirth and solidarity had gained momentum within the pan-Africanist movement". Reflecting his African heritage, Nkrumah frequently eschewed Western fashion, donning a fugu (a Northern attire) made with Southern-produced Kente cloth, a symbol of his identity as a representative of the entire country. He oversaw the opening of the Ghana Museum on 5 March 1957; the Arts Council of Ghana, a wing of the Ministry of Education and Culture, in 1958; the Research Library on African Affairs in June 1961; and the Ghana Film Corporation in 1964. In 1962, Nkrumah opened the Institute of African Studies.

A campaign against nudity in the northern part of the country received special attention from Nkrumah, who reportedly deployed Propaganda Secretary Hannah Cudjoe to respond. Cudjoe also formed the Ghana Women's League, which advanced the Party's agenda on nutrition, raising children, and wearing clothing. The League also led a demonstration against the detonation of French nuclear weapons in the Sahara. Cudjoe was eventually demoted with the consolidation of national women's groups, and marginalized within the Party structure.

Laws passed in 1959 and 1960 designated special positions in parliament to be held by women. Some women were promoted to the CPP Central Committee. Women attended more universities, took up more professions including medicine and law, and went on professional trips to Israel, the Soviet Union, and the Eastern Bloc. Women also entered the army and air force. Most women remained in agriculture and trade; some received assistance from the Co-operative Movement.

Nkrumah's image was widely disseminated, for example, on postage stamps and on money, in the style of monarchs – providing fodder for accusations of a Nkrumahist personality cult.

Media 
In 1957 Nkrumah created a well-funded Ghana News Agency to generate domestic news and disseminate it abroad. In ten years time the GNA had 8045 km of domestic telegraph line, and maintained stations in Lagos, Nairobi, London and New York City.

Nkrumah consolidated state control over newspapers, establishing the Ghanaian Times in 1958 and then in 1962 obtaining its competitor, the Daily Graphic, from the Mirror Group of London. As he wrote in Africa Must Unite: "It is part of our revolutionary credo that within the competitive system of capitalism, the press cannot function in accordance with a strict regard for the sacredness of facts, and that the press, therefore, should not remain in private hands." Starting in 1960, he invoked the right of pre-publication censorship of all news.

The Gold Coast Broadcasting Service was established in 1954 and revamped as the Ghana Broadcasting Corporation (GBC). Many television broadcasts featured Nkrumah, commenting for example on the problematic "insolence and laziness of boys and girls". Before celebrations of May Day, 1963, Nkrumah went on television to announce the expansion of Ghana's Young Pioneers, the introduction of a National Pledge, the beginning of a National Flag salute in schools, and the creation of a National Training program to inculcate virtue and the spirit of service among Ghanaian youth. Quoth Nkrumah (to Parliament, on 15 October 1963), "Ghana's television will not cater for cheap entertainment or commercialism; its paramount objective will be education in its broadest and purest sense."

As per the 1965 Instrument of Incorporation of the Ghana Broadcasting Corporation, the Minister of Information and Broadcasting had "powers of direction" over the media, and the President had the power "at any time, if he is satisfied that it is in the national interest to do so, take over the control and management of the affairs or any part of the functions of the Corporation," hiring, firing, reorganizing, and making other commands at will.

Radio programmes, designed in part to reach non-reading members of the public, were a major focus of the Ghana Broadcasting Corporation. In 1961, the GBC formed an external service broadcasting in English, French, Arabic, Swahili, Portuguese and Hausa. Using four 100-kilowatt transmitters and two 250-kilowatt transmitters, the GBC External Service broadcast 110 hours of Pan-Africanist programming to Africa and Europe each week.

He refused advertising in all media, beginning with the Evening News of 1948.

Economic policy

The Gold Coast had been among the wealthiest and most socially advanced areas in Africa, with schools, railways, hospitals, social security, and an advanced economy.

Nkrumah attempted to rapidly industrialize Ghana's economy. He reasoned that if Ghana escaped the colonial trade system by reducing dependence on foreign capital, technology, and material goods, it could become truly independent.

After the Ten Year Development Plan, Nkrumah brought forth the Second Development Plan in 1959. This plan called for the development of manufacturing: 600 factories producing 100 varieties of product.

The Statutory Corporations Act, passed in November 1959 and revised in 1961 and 1964, created the legal framework for public corporations, which included state enterprises. This law placed the country's major corporations under the direction of government ministers. The State Enterprises Secretariat office was located in Flagstaff House and under the direct control of the president.

After visiting the Soviet Union, Eastern Europe and China in 1961, Nkrumah apparently became still more convinced of the need for state control of the economy.

Nkrumah's time in office began successfully: forestry, fishing, and cattle-breeding expanded, production of cocoa (Ghana's main export) doubled, and modest deposits of bauxite and gold were exploited more effectively. The construction of a dam on the River Volta (launched in 1961) provided water for irrigation and hydro-electric power, which produced enough electricity for the towns and for a new aluminum plant. Government funds were also provided for village projects in which local people built schools and roads, while free health care and education were introduced.

A Seven-Year Plan introduced in 1964 focused on further industrialization, emphasizing domestic substitutes for common imports, modernization of the building materials industry, machine making, electrification and electronics.

Energy projects 

Nkrumah's advocacy of industrial development, with help of longtime friend and Minister of Finance, Komla Agbeli Gbedema, led to the Volta River Project: the construction of a hydroelectric power plant, the Akosombo Dam on the Volta River in eastern Ghana. The Volta River Project was the centrepiece of Nkrumah's economic programme. On 20 February 1958, he told the National Assembly: "It is my strong belief that the Volta River Project provides the quickest and most certain method of leading us towards economic independence." Ghana invoked assistance from the United States, Israel and the World Bank in constructing the dam.

Kaiser Aluminum agreed to build the dam for Nkrumah, but restricted what could be produced using the power generated. Nkrumah borrowed money to build the dam, and placed Ghana in debt. To finance the debt, he raised taxes on the cocoa farmers in the south. This accentuated regional differences and jealousy. The dam was completed and opened by Nkrumah amidst global publicity on 22 January 1966.

Nkrumah initiated the Ghana Nuclear Reactor Project in 1961, created the Ghana Atomic Energy Commission in 1963, and in 1964 laid the first stone in the building of an atomic energy facility.

Cocoa 

In 1954 the world price of cocoa rose from £150 to £450 per ton. Rather than allowing cocoa farmers to keep the windfall, Nkrumah appropriated the increased revenue via central government levies, then invested the capital into various national development projects. This policy alienated one of the major constituencies that helped him come to power.

Prices continued to fluctuate. In 1960 one ton of cocoa sold for £250 in London. By August 1965 this price had dropped to £91, one fifth of its value ten years before. The quick price decline caused the government's reliance on the reserves and forced farmers to take a portion of their earning in bonds.

Foreign and military policy 

Nkrumah actively promoted a policy of Pan-Africanism from the beginning of his presidency. This entailed the creation of a series of new international organizations, which held their inaugural meetings in Accra. These were:
 the First Conference of Independent States, in April 1958;
 the more inclusive All-African Peoples' Conference, with representatives from 62 nationalist organizations from across the continent, in December 1958;
 the All-African Trade Union Federation, meeting in November 1959, to coordinate the African labour movement;
 the Positive Action and Security in Africa conference, in April 1960, discussing Algeria, South Africa, and French nuclear weapons testing;
 the Conference of African Women, on 18 July 1960.

Meanwhile, Ghana withdrew from colonial organizations including West Africa Airways Corporation, the West African Currency Board, the West African Cocoa Research Institute, and the West African Court of Appeal.

In the Year of Africa, 1960, Nkrumah negotiated the creation of a Union of African States, a political alliance between Ghana, Guinea, and Mali. Immediately there formed a women's group called Women of the Union of African States.

Nkrumah was a leading figure in the short-lived Casablanca Group of African leaders, which sought to achieve pan-African unity and harmony through deep political, economic, and military integration of the continent in the early 1960s prior to the establishment of the Organization of African Unity (OAU).

Nkrumah was instrumental in the creation of the OAU in Addis Ababa in 1963. He aspired to create a united military force, the African High Command, which Ghana would substantially lead, and committed to this vision in Article 2 of the 1960 Republican Constitution:"In the confident expectation of an early surrender of sovereignty to a union of African states and territories, the people now confer on Parliament the power to provide for the surrender of the whole or any part of the sovereignty of Ghana."

He was also a proponent of the United Nations, but critical of the Great Powers' ability to control it.

Nkrumah opposed entry of African states into the Common Market of the European Economic Community, a status given to many former French colonies and considered by Nigeria. Instead, Nkrumah advocated, in a speech given on 7 April 1960,

an African common market, a common currency area and the development of communications of all kinds to allow the free flow of goods and services. International capital can be attracted to such viable economic areas, but it would not be attracted to a divided and balkanized Africa, with each small region engaged in senseless and suicidal economic competition with its neighbours.

Nkrumah sought to exploit the Cold War rivalry between the United States and the Soviet Union in order to gain maximum concessions from both sides in their geopolitical attempts to outmanoeuvre one another in West Africa and elsewhere. This was exemplified by the Volta River Dam Project and its back-and-forth oscillation between Soviet and Western financial backing.

Armed forces 
In 1956, Ghana took control of the Royal West African Frontier Force (RWAFF), Gold Coast Regiment, from the British War Office. This force had formerly been deployed to quell internal dissent, and occasionally to fight in wars: most recently, in World War II, against the Japanese in India and Burma. The most senior officers in this force were British, and, although training of African officers began in 1947, only 28 of 212 officers in December 1956 were indigenous Africans. The British officers still received British salaries, which vastly exceeded those allotted to their Ghanaian counterparts. Concerned about a possible military coup, Nkrumah delayed the placement of African officers in top leadership roles.

Nkrumah quickly established the Ghanaian Air Force, acquiring 14 Beaver airplanes from Canada and setting up a flight school with British instructors. Otters, Caribou, and Chipmunks were to follow. Ghana also obtained four Ilyushin-18 aircraft from the Soviet Union. Preparation began in April 1959 with assistance from India and Israel.

The Ghanaian Navy received two inshore minesweepers with 40mm and 20mm guns, the Afadzato and the Yogaga, from Britain in December 1959. It subsequently received the Elmina and the Komenda, seaward defence boats with 40-millimetre guns. The Navy's flagship, and training ship, was the Achimota, a British yacht constructed during World War II. In 1961, the Navy ordered two 600-ton corvettes, the Keta and Kromantse, from Vosper & Company and received them in 1967. It also procured four Soviet patrol boats. Naval officers were trained at the Britannia Royal Naval College in Dartmouth. The Ghanaian military budget rose each year, from $9.35 million (US dollars) in 1958 to $47 million in 1965.

The first international deployment of the Ghanaian armed forces was to Congo (Léopoldville/Kinshasa), where Ghanaian troops were airlifted in 1960 at the beginning of the Congo crisis. One week after Belgian troops occupied the lucrative mining province of Katanga, Ghana dispatched more than a thousand of its own troops to join a United Nations force. The use of British officers in this context was politically unacceptable, and this event occasioned a hasty transfer of officer positions to Ghanaians. The Congo war was long and difficult. On 19 January 1961 the Third Infantry Battalion mutinied. On 28 April 1961, 43 men were massacred in a surprise attack by the Congolese army.

Ghana also gave military support to rebels fighting against Ian Smith's white-minority government in Rhodesia (now Zimbabwe), which had unilaterally declared independence from Britain in 1965.

Relationship with Communist world 

In 1961, Nkrumah went on tour through Eastern Europe, proclaiming solidarity with the Soviet Union and the People's Republic of China. Nkrumah's clothing changed to the Chinese-supplied Mao suit.

In 1962 Kwame Nkrumah was awarded the Lenin Peace Prize by the Soviet Union.

Overthrow 

In February 1966, while Nkrumah was on a state visit to North Vietnam and China, his government was overthrown in a violent coup d'état led by the national military and police forces, with backing from the civil service. The conspirators, led by Joseph Arthur Ankrah, named themselves the National Liberation Council and ruled as a military government for three years. Nkrumah did not learn of the coup until he arrived in China. After the coup, Nkrumah stayed in Beijing for four days and Premier Zhou Enlai treated him with courtesy.

Nkrumah alluded to American involvement in the coup in his 1969 memoir Dark Days in Ghana; he may have based this conclusion on documents shown to him by the KGB. In 1978 John Stockwell, former Chief of the Angola Task Force of the CIA turned critic, wrote that agents at the CIA's Accra station "maintained intimate contact with the plotters as a coup was hatched". Afterward, "inside CIA headquarters the Accra station was given full, if unofficial credit for the eventual coup. ...None of this was adequately reflected in the agency's written records." Later the same year, Seymour Hersh of The New York Times, citing "first hand intelligence sources," defended Stockwell's account, claiming that "many CIA operatives in Africa considered the agency's role in the overthrow of Dr. Nkrumah to have been pivotal." These claims have never been verified.

Following the coup, Ghana realigned itself internationally, cutting its close ties to Guinea and the Eastern Bloc, accepting a new friendship with the Western Bloc, and inviting the International Monetary Fund and World Bank to take a leading role in managing the economy. With this reversal, accentuated by the expulsion of immigrants and a new willingness to negotiate with apartheid South Africa, Ghana lost a good deal of its stature in the eyes of African nationalists.

In assessing Nkrumah's legacy, Edward Luttwak argued that he was undone by the growth of political consciousness and his inability to repress potential opponents:

Exile, death, tributes and legacy
Nkrumah never returned to Ghana, but he continued to push for his vision of African unity. He lived in exile in Conakry, Guinea, as the guest of President Ahmed Sékou Touré, who made him honorary co-president of the country. Nkrumah read, wrote, corresponded, gardened, and entertained guests. Despite retirement from public office, he felt that he was still threatened by Western intelligence agencies. When his cook died mysteriously, he feared that someone would poison him, and began hoarding food in his room. He suspected that foreign agents were going through his mail, and lived in constant fear of abduction and assassination. In failing health, he flew to Bucharest, Romania, for medical treatment in August 1971. He died of prostate cancer in April 1972 at the age of 62 while in Romania.

Nkrumah was buried in a tomb in the village of his birth, Nkroful, Ghana. While the tomb remains in Nkroful, his remains were transferred to a large national memorial tomb and park in Accra, Ghana.

Over his lifetime, Nkrumah was awarded honorary doctorates by many universities including Lincoln University (Pennsylvania), Moscow State University (USSR), Cairo University (Egypt), Jagiellonian University (Poland) and Humboldt University (East Germany).

In 2000, he was voted African Man of the Millennium by listeners to the BBC World Service, being described by the BBC as a "Hero of Independence", and an "International symbol of freedom as the leader of the first black African country to shake off the chains of colonial rule."According to intelligence documents released by the U.S. Department of State's Office of the Historian, "Nkrumah was doing more to undermine [U.S. government] interests than any other black African."

In September 2009, President John Atta Mills declared 21 September (the 100th anniversary of Kwame Nkrumah's birth) to be Founders' Day, a statutory holiday in Ghana to celebrate the legacy of Kwame Nkrumah. In April 2019, President Akufo-Addo approved the Public Holidays (Amendment) Act 2019 which changed 21 September from Founders' Day to Kwame Nkrumah Memorial Day.

He generally took a non-aligned Marxist perspective on economics, and believed capitalism had malignant effects that were going to stay with Africa for a long time. Although he was clear on distancing himself from the African socialism of many of his contemporaries, Nkrumah argued that socialism was the system that would best accommodate the changes that capitalism had brought, while still respecting African values. He specifically addresses these issues and his politics in a 1967 essay entitled "African Socialism Revisited":
We know that the traditional African society was founded on principles of egalitarianism. In its actual workings, however, it had various shortcomings. Its humanist impulse, nevertheless, is something that continues to urge us towards our all-African socialist reconstruction. We postulate each man to be an end in himself, not merely a means; and we accept the necessity of guaranteeing each man equal opportunities for his development. The implications of this for sociopolitical practice have to be worked out scientifically, and the necessary social and economic policies pursued with resolution. Any meaningful humanism must begin from egalitarianism and must lead to objectively chosen policies for safeguarding and sustaining egalitarianism. Hence, socialism. Hence, also, scientific socialism.

Nkrumah was also best-known politically for his strong commitment to and promotion of pan-Africanism. He was inspired by the writings of black intellectuals such as Marcus Garvey, W. E. B. Du Bois, and George Padmore, and his relationships with them. Much of his understanding and relationship to these men was created during his years in America as a student. Some would argue that his greatest inspiration was Marcus Garvey, although he also had a meaningful relationship with C. L. R. James. Nkrumah looked to these men to craft a general solution to the ills of Africa. To follow in these intellectual footsteps Nkrumah had intended to continue his education in London, but found himself involved in direct activism. Then, motivated by advice from Du Bois, Nkrumah decided to focus on creating peace in Africa. He became a passionate advocate of the "African Personality" embodied in the slogan "Africa for the Africans" earlier popularised by Edward Wilmont Blyden and he viewed political independence as a prerequisite for economic independence. Nkrumah's dedications to pan-Africanism in action attracted these intellectuals to his Ghanaian projects. Many Americans, such as Du Bois and Kwame Ture, moved to Ghana to join him in his efforts. These men are buried there today. His press officer for six years was the Grenadian anticolonialist Sam Morris. Nkrumah's biggest success in this area was his significant influence in the founding of the Organisation of African Unity.

Nkrumah also became a symbol for black liberation in the United States. When in 1958 the Harlem Lawyers Association had an event in Nkrumah's honour, diplomat Ralph Bunche told him:

We salute you, Kwame Nkrumah, not only because you are Prime Minister of Ghana, although this is cause enough. We salute you because you are a true and living representation of our hopes and ideals, of the determination we have to be accepted fully as equal beings, of the pride we have held and nurtured in our African origin, of the freedom of which we know we are capable, of the freedom in which we believe, of the dignity imperative to our stature as men.

In 1961, Nkrumah delivered a speech called "I Speak Of Freedom". During this speech he talked about how "Africa could become one of the greatest forces for good in the world". He mentions how Africa is a land of "vast riches" with mineral resources from that "range from gold and diamonds to uranium and petroleum". Nkrumah says that the reason Africa isn't thriving right now is because the European powers have been taking all the wealth for themselves. If Africa could be independent of European rule, he said, then it could truly flourish and contribute positively to the world. In the ending words of this speech Nkrumah calls his people to action by saying "This is our chance. We must act now. Tomorrow may be too late and the opportunity will have passed, and with it the hope of free Africa's survival". This rallied the nation in a nationalistic movement.

Personal life
Kwame Nkrumah married Fathia Ritzk, an Egyptian Coptic bank worker and former teacher, on the evening of her arrival in Ghana: New Year's Eve, 1957–1958. Fathia's mother refused to bless their marriage, after another one of her children left with a foreign husband.

As a married couple, the Nkrumah family had three children: Gamal (born 1959), Samia (born 1960), and Sekou (born 1963). Gamal is a newspaper journalist, while Samia and Sekou are politicians. Nkrumah also has another son, Francis, a paediatrician (born 1962). There may be another son, Onsy Anwar Nathan Kwame Nkrumah, born to an Egyptian mother and an additional daughter, Elizabeth. Onsy's claim to be Nkrumah's son is disputed by Nkrumah's other children.

Cultural depictions
In the 2010 book The Other Wes Moore, Nkrumah, during his time in the United States, is noted to have served as a mentor to the author's grandfather for several months upon the immigration of the author's family into the country.

Nkrumah is played by Danny Sapani in the Netflix television series The Crown (season 2, episode 8 "Dear Mrs Kennedy"). The show's portrayal of the historical significance of the Queen's visit to Ghana and dance with Nkrumah has been described as exaggerated in one source interviewing Nat Nuno-Amarteifio, later mayor of Accra, who was a teenage student at the time.

African's Black Star: The Legacy of Kwame Nkrumah is a 2011 film about the rise and fall of this colonial rebellion leader.

A golden statue of Nkrumah is a center piece in Ghanaian rapper Serious Klein's 2021 video "Straight Outta Pandemic".

Works by Kwame Nkrumah

 "Negro History: European Government in Africa", The Lincolnian, 12 April 1938, p. 2 (Lincoln University, Pennsylvania) – see Special Collections and Archives, Lincoln University 
 Ghana: The Autobiography of Kwame Nkrumah (1957). 
 Africa Must Unite (1963). 
 African Personality (1963)

 Neo-Colonialism, the Last Stage of Imperialism (1965)
 Axioms of Kwame Nkrumah (1967). 
 African Socialism Revisited (1967)
 Challenge of the Congo (1967)
Voice From Conakry (1967). 
 Dark Days in Ghana (1968). 
 Handbook of Revolutionary Warfare (1968) – first introduction of Pan-African pellet compass. 
 Consciencism: Philosophy and Ideology for De-Colonisation (1970). 
 Class Struggle in Africa (1970). 
 The Struggle Continues (1973). 
 I Speak of Freedom (1973). 
 Revolutionary Path (1973).

Festival 
For details see Kwame Nkrumah Festival

See also
 Nkrumah government

Notes

References

Bibliography

Further reading 

 Arhin, Kwame (1993). The Life and Work of Kwame Nkrumah. Trenton, NJ: Africa World Press, Inc.  (08543395X)
 Baynham, Simon (1988). The Military and Politics in Nkrumah's Ghana. Westview Special Studies on Africa. Boulder, CO: Westview Press, Inc. (Frederick A. Praeger), 
 Biney, Ama. "The Legacy of Kwame Nkrumah in Retrospect." Journal of Pan African Studies 2.3 (2008). online , historiography
 Biney, Ama. The political and social thought of Kwame Nkrumah (2011).
 Biney, Ama. "The Development of Kwame Nkrumah's Political Thought in Exile, 1966–1972." Journal of African History 50.1 (2009): 81–100.
 Bretton, Henry L. The rise and fall of Kwame Nkrumah: a study of personal rule in Africa (1967).
 
 Defense Intelligence Agency, "Supplement, Kwame Nkrumah, President of Ghana", 12-January-1966.
 Gerits, Frank. "'When the Bull Elephants Fight': Kwame Nkrumah, Non-Alignment, and Pan-Africanism as an Interventionist Ideology in the Global Cold War (1957–66)."  International History Review 37.5 (2015): 951–969.
 Gocking, Roger S.  The History of Ghana (2005).
 
 
 Milne, June. Kwame Nkrumah: a biography (1999).
 
 Mwakikagile, Godfrey (2015), Western Involvement in Nkrumah's Downfall. Dar es Salaam, Tanzania: New Africa Press. 
 Omari, T. Peter. Kwame Nkrumah: The anatomy of an African dictatorship (1970).
 Pinkney, Robert (1972). Ghana Under Military Rule 1966–1969. London: Methuen & Co Ltd. 
 
 Rooney, David. Kwame Nkrumah: The Political Kingdom in the Third World (1988).
 Rui Lopes & Víctor Barros (2019) "Amílcar Cabral and the Liberation of Guinea-Bissau and Cape Verde: International, Transnational, and Global Dimensions." The International History Review.
 
 Smertin, Yuri. Kwame Nkrumah. Moscow: Progress Publishers. 1987.
 
 
 Žák, Tomáš František (2016). "Applying the Weapon of Theory: Comparing the Philosophy of Julius Kambarage Nyerere and Kwame Nkrumah". Journal of African Cultural Studies. 28 (2): 147–160. doi:10.1080/13696815.2015.1053798. S2CID 146709996.

External links

 Faces of Africa Kwame Nkrumah
 Kwame Nkrumah Mausoleum and Museum at Nkroful, Western Region
 Kwame Nkrumah Memorial Park & Museum, Accra
 Ghana-pedia Dr. Kwame Nkrumah
 Ghana-pedia Operation Cold Chop: The Fall Of Kwame Nkrumah
 Dr Kwame Nkrumah
 Excerpt from Commanding Heights by Daniel Yergin and Joseph Stanislaw
 Timeline of events related to the overthrow of Kwame Nkrumah
 The Kwame Nkrumah Lectures at the University of Cape Coast, Ghana, 2007 
 Kwame Nkrumah Information and Resource Site
 Ghana re-evaluates Nkrumah by The Global Post
 Dr Kwame Nkrumah's Midnight Speech on the day of Ghana's independence – 6 March 1957.
 Newsreel on First Conference of Independent African States

|-

|-

|-

|-

|-

|-

|-

|-

 
1909 births
1972 deaths
African revolutionaries
Chairpersons of the African Union
Alumni of Achimota School
Alumni of the London School of Economics
Anti-imperialism
Burials in Ghana
Convention People's Party (Ghana) politicians
Deaths from cancer in Romania
Deaths from prostate cancer
Defence ministers of Ghana
Exiled politicians
Foreign ministers of Ghana
Ghanaian Christian socialists
Ghanaian expatriates in the United States
Ghanaian MPs 1951–1954
Ghanaian MPs 1954–1956
Ghanaian MPs 1956–1965
Ghanaian MPs 1965–1966
Ghanaian pan-Africanists
Ghanaian Roman Catholics
Interior ministers of Ghana
Leaders ousted by a coup
Lenin Peace Prize recipients
Lincoln University (Pennsylvania) alumni
Members of Gray's Inn
Members of the Privy Council of the United Kingdom
Presidents for life
Presidents of Ghana
Prime ministers of Ghana
United Gold Coast Convention politicians
University of Pennsylvania alumni
University of Pennsylvania Graduate School of Education alumni
Ghanaian independence activists
Ghanaian Marxists
Ghanaian expatriates in Romania
Akan people
Imperialism studies
Fellows of the Ghana Academy of Arts and Sciences